Warren is a town in Washington County, Vermont, United States. The population was 1,977 at the 2020 census. The center of population of Vermont is located in Warren. It is set between the two ranges of the Green Mountains, with approximately 25% of the town under Green Mountain National Forest ownership. Sugarbush Resort located here is a ski resort, and the town is traversed by the Long Trail, a hiking trail running from the border with Massachusetts to the Canada–US border.

History

Granted on November 9, 1780, Warren was chartered on October 20, 1789, to John Throop and 67 others. It was named for Dr. Joseph Warren, Revolutionary War patriot. The first settlers, Samuel Lard and Seth Leavitt, arrived in 1797. Mills were built on the Mad River to grind grain or manufacture lumber and clapboards. On the fertile intervales, farmers grew hay. By 1839, when the town's population was 766, cattle and about 4000 sheep grazed the hills. Milk and maple syrup were important goods.

A ski resort was developed here in the 20th century. It began in the late 1930s with the first ski tow established in the Mad River Valley, erected by the Warren Outing Club. In 1958, Damon Gadd and Jack Murphy founded Sugarbush Ski Area on the northeast side of Lincoln Peak. A three-seat gondola was installed, at that time the nation's longest lift, which had been manufactured in Italy. Eventually this evolved into what is today Sugarbush Resort.

Geography
Warren is drained by the Mad River, a tributary of the Winooski River which flows to Lake Champlain.

The town is crossed by Vermont Route 100 and served by Warren-Sugarbush Airport.

Demographics

As of the census of 2000, there were 1,681 people, 742 households, and 437 families residing in the town.  The population density was 42.0 people per square mile (16.2/km2).  There were 2,078 housing units at an average density of 51.9 per square mile (20.0/km2).  The racial makeup of the town was 97.98% White, 0.18% African American, 0.36% Native American, 0.24% Asian, 0.06% from other races, and 1.19% from two or more races. Hispanic or Latino of any race were 1.01% of the population.

There were 742 households, out of which 28.3% had children under the age of 18 living with them, 50.1% were married couples living together, 5.9% had a female householder with no husband present, and 41.1% were non-families. 31.3% of all households were made up of individuals, and 5.9% had someone living alone who was 65 years of age or older.  The average household size was 2.27 and the average family size was 2.89.

In the town, the population was spread out, with 22.9% under the age of 18, 5.1% from 18 to 24, 30.8% from 25 to 44, 31.6% from 45 to 64, and 9.6% who were 65 years of age or older.  The median age was 40 years. For every 100 females, there were 106.3 males.  For every 100 females age 18 and over, there were 108.7 males.

The median income for a household in the town was $47,438, and the median income for a family was $57,206. Males had a median income of $32,054 versus $25,588 for females. The per capita income for the town was $30,405.  About 5.1% of families and 8.0% of the population were below the poverty line, including 8.3% of those under age 18 and 3.8% of those age 65 or over.

Site of interest
 Warren Covered Bridge

References

External links
 Town of Warren official website
 Warren Public Library
 Sugarbush Ski Resort
 Snow Report

 
Towns in Vermont
Towns in Washington County, Vermont